Caoch Ceise Ó Clúmháin, Gaelic-Irish poet, fl. 14th century.

Caoch Cise was a member of the Ó Chlúmháin family of Connacht. Lambert McKenna ascribes to him poem XVII in Leabhar Méig Shamhradháin, which praises Niall Mág Shamhradháin and his wife, Sadhbh Ní Conchobhair. The poem credits them with maintaining many poets and bards, also stating that the prince gets none of his princely renown without a princely portion accruing to Sadhbh.

References

 Leabhar Méig Shamhradháin, ed. and trans. Lambert McKenna, Dublin, 1947.

Medieval Irish poets
People from Connacht
Year of birth missing
Year of death unknown
14th-century Irish writers
14th-century Irish poets
Irish male poets
Irish-language writers